Nassau (also  ,) is a geographical, historical and cultural region in today's Rhineland-Palatinate and Hesse in western Germany. Named for the town of Nassau, it includes the territory of the Duchy of Nassau, a former sovereign country which existed until 1866. Occupied by Prussia and annexed into the Province of Hesse-Nassau in 1866, Nassau briefly became the name of a separate province, the Province of Nassau, in 1944. Much of the area is today part of the Nassau Nature Park. Nassau is also the name of the smaller Nassau collective municipality, the area surrounding the town of Nassau.

Overview
Nassau is located on the German-Dutch Orange Route, and has strong historical and cultural ties to nearby Luxembourg and historical ties to the Netherlands, which were both ruled by the House of Nassau and are still ruled by its descendants. "Duke of Nassau" is still used as the secondary title (of pretense) by the Grand Duke of Luxembourg. The coat of arms of the Netherlands used the Nassau arms with additions from the Dutch Republic Lion, the coat of arms of the Grand Duke of Luxembourg incorporates the Nassau arms in its second hand third field,  the coat of arms of Nassau, Rhineland-Palatinate depictes the Nassau arms in its upper half field, and the seal of Nassau County, New York adopted the Nassau arms in the middle. The Nassau name is also part of the name of the Dutch royal family, Orange-Nassau, and its secondary titles of Prince or Princess of Orange-Nassau.

The Nassau cultural identity can be seen in the name of the regional newspaper Nassauische Neue Presse and the savings bank .

Both Nassau County, Florida and Nassau County, New York, as well as the city of Nassau, Bahamas are named for the region in Germany.

Cities and towns

The most important cities and towns of Nassau, and of the former Duchy of Nassau, are:
Nassau
Braubach
Nastätten
St. Goarshausen
Schwalbach
Wehen
Idstein
Wiesbaden
Eltville
Rüdesheim
Höchst
Königstein
Usingen
Weilburg
Diez
Limburg
Hadamar
Montabaur
Westerburg
Rennerod
Marienberg
Hachenburg
Herborn
Dillenburg

Literature
Herzogtum Nassau 1806–1866. Politik – Wirtschaft – Kultur, Historische Kommission für Nassau, Wiesbaden 1981, 

Regions of Rhineland-Palatinate
Regions of Hesse